(655? – February 4, 733), or , is a court lady of early Nara period and mother of Empress Kōmyō.

In 679, around 15 years old, Michiyo became a Myōbu. At November 708, her clan was given honorary surname "Tachibana Sukune" by Empress Genmei. In 721 she became a Buddhist nun for a brief period to pray for the health of Empress Genmei.

She married Prince Minu, a descendant of Emperor Bidatsu first and bore three children - Prince Katsuragi (later Tachibana no Moroe), Prince Sai (later Tachibana no Sai) and Princess Moro.
Soon after Prince Minu's death, she married Fujiwara no Fuhito, while his principal wife had died at that time. They had a daughter named Kōmyōshi, which is Fuhito's third daughter. Many of Michiyo's descendants also married Fuhito's descendants. It's unknown if Fuhito's fourth daughter, Tahino, the principal wife of Tachibana no Moroe is by her.

Before the birth of her first child, she had become the wet nurse of later Emperor Monmu, and highly trusted by his mother Empress Genmei and paternal grandmother Empress Jitō. Using her influence, she later made Fuhito's first daughter Miyako, by Kamonohime, a consort of Emperor Monmu. When Miyako and Emperor Monmu's child Emperor Shōmu had grown up, he take his younger half-aunt Fujiwara no Kōmyōshi as empress, having a daughter Empress Kōken and a son Prince Motoi. His other consorts are all descendants of Michiyo and/or Fuhito. Using this kind of excessive inbreeding method, Michiyo and Fuhito had ensured their genes rooted in the Imperial house of Japan.

People of Asuka-period Japan
People of Nara-period Japan
8th-century Buddhist nuns
Japanese Buddhist nuns
Asuka period Buddhist nuns
Man'yō poets
733 deaths
Japanese ladies-in-waiting
7th-century Japanese women